Thomas Duncan Ormond (born 10 October 1950) is a former association football player who represented New Zealand at international level.

Biography
Ormond was born in Harthill, Scotland, on 10 October 1950, and migrated with his family to New Zealand in 1961. He became a naturalised New Zealand citizen in 1979.

Ormond scored the winner on his full All Whites debut in a 1–0 win over Australia on 13 June 1979 and ended his international playing career with seven A-international caps to his credit. His debut goal was the only international goal he scored in official FIFA matches. He earned his final cap in a 3–0 loss to Canada on 18 September 1980.

Ormond comes from good football pedigree, his uncle Willie Ormond represented Scotland at the 1954 FIFA World Cup as a player and the 1974 FIFA World Cup as manager, while his father Bert Ormond and brother Ian Ormond and daughter Vicki Ormond also represented New Zealand.

References

1950 births
Living people
Scottish emigrants to New Zealand
Naturalised citizens of New Zealand
New Zealand association footballers
New Zealand international footballers
Association footballers not categorized by position